The 43rd edition of the annual Clásico RCN was held from August 24 to August 31, 2003, in Colombia. The stage race with an UCI rate of 2.3 started in Medellín and finished in Bogotá. RCN stands for "Radio Cadena Nacional".

Stages

2003-08-24: Medellín — Carmen de Viboral (111.5 km)

2003-08-25: Sabaneta — Manizales (184.8 km)

2003-08-26: Pereira — Cali (204 km)

2003-08-27: Buga — Ibagué (191.8 km)

2003-08-28: Ibagué — Mosquera (194.8 km)

2003-08-29: Chia — Villa de Leyva (162.2 km)

2003-08-30: Villa de Leyva — Tunja (41.4 km)

2003-08-31: Tunja — Bogotá (142.4 km)

Final classification

Teams 

Colombia — Selle Italia

Lotería de Boyacá

Orbitel 05

Aguardiente Antioqueño — Lotería de Medellín

Cundeportes — Juegos Nacionales

Coldeportes Boyacá — Aguardiente Líder

Orbitel 05

Ciclo Acosta — Bello — Gripogen — Seres

Club Rotarios de Bello

Cicloases Cundinamarca

Mixto Uno

Mixto Dos

EPM.net-IDEA

See also 
 2003 Vuelta a Colombia

References 
 cyclingnews
 maspedal

Clásico RCN
Clasico RCN
Clasico RCN